Jude Supan Sebamalalainayakam (born 30 July 1998) is a Sri Lankan international footballer who plays as a defender for Renown SC in the Sri Lanka Football Premier League.

References

Sri Lankan footballers
Living people
Sri Lanka international footballers
Association football defenders
1998 births
Sri Lanka Football Premier League players
Renown SC players